Her Greatest Hits: Songs of Long Ago is the first official compilation album by Carole King. It was released in 1978 and features twelve songs that had previously appeared on her six studio albums released between 1971 and 1976. The album was re-released on CD in 1999 with two additional tracks.

Background
Her Greatest Hits: Songs of Long Ago is Carole King's first compilation album. The original release features twelve songs which had previously appeared on her studio albums Tapestry, Music, Rhymes and Reasons, Fantasy, Wrap Around Joy and Thoroughbred. Four of the songs had appeared on her second album Tapestry, one of the most successful albums in the history of popular music. "Brother, Brother", a song of her third album Music, is the only one chosen for the compilation LP that was never released as a single. The original release does not feature any songs from her debut album Writer or from her two most recent albums at the time of the initial release, Simple Things and Welcome Home.

The 1999 re-release of the album was digitally remastered and included the live versions of two more songs as performed during her Carnegie Hall concert in 1971: "Eventually," from her debut album Writer, and "(You Make Me Feel Like) A Natural Woman," which was originally recorded by Aretha Franklin in 1967 and was covered by King for Tapestry.

Track listing

1978 release

1999 re-release
The 1999 re-release features the original album digitally remastered along with two additional live recordings from the album Carnegie Hall Concert: June 18, 1971.

Charts

Weekly charts

Certifications

Personnel

Carole King - keyboards, vocals, backing vocals, arrangement, conductor
Ralph Schuckett - organ, electric piano
James Taylor - acoustic guitar, backing vocals
Danny "Kootch" Kortchmar - electric guitar, congas
Dean Parks - guitar
Waddy Wachtel - electric guitar
David T. Walker - electric guitar
Charles Larkey - electric bass
Lee Sklar - electric bass
Russ Kunkel - drums
Harvey Mason - drums
Andy Newmark - drums
Joel O'Brien - drums
Ms. Bobbye Hall - percussion
Ralph MacDonald - percussion
Teresa Calderon - congas
Tom Scott - saxophone
Mike Altschul - saxophone, woodwinds
Ernie Watts - saxophone, woodwinds

Curtis Amy - tenor saxophone, soprano saxophone, baritone saxophone, flute
Oscar Brashear - flugelhorn
Charlie Loper - trombone
Dick "Slyde" Hyde - trombone
George Bohanon - trombone, euphonium
Ollie Mitchell - trumpet, flugelhorn
Chuck Findley - trumpet, flugelhorn
Albert Aarons - trumpet, flugelhorn
William Green - woodwinds
William Collette - woodwinds
Plas Johnson - woodwinds
Norman Kurban and David Campbell - string conducting & arrangement
Merry Clayton - backing vocals
Louise Goffin - backing vocals
Sherry Goffin - backing vocals
Julia Tillman - backing vocals

References

External links
The album at caroleking.com (1978 edition)
The album at caroleking.com (1999 edition)

1978 greatest hits albums
Carole King albums
Albums produced by Lou Adler
Ode Records albums